Hibana incursa is a species of ghost spider in the family Anyphaenidae. It is found in USA to Panama.

References

Further reading

 
 
 

Anyphaenidae
Spiders described in 1919